Silene aperta is a rare species of flowering plant in the family Caryophyllaceae known by the common names naked catchfly and Tulare campion. It is endemic to Tulare County, California, where it is known only from the coniferous forests of the High Sierra Nevada. It is a perennial herb growing from a woody, branching caudex sending up several erect stems up to about 60 centimeters tall. The lower leaves are linear in shape, up to 12 centimeters long but less than one wide. Leaves higher on the stem are smaller. The flower has a hairy, tubular calyx of fused sepals with ten veins. The calyx is open at the top, revealing five white or yellow-green petals each 1 to 2 centimeters long.

References

External links
Jepson Manual Treatment
USDA Plants Profile
Flora of North America
Photo gallery

aperta
Endemic flora of California
Flora of the Sierra Nevada (United States)
Natural history of Tulare County, California
Flora without expected TNC conservation status